Federal Route 72, or Jalan Bota Kiri, is a federal road in Perak, Malaysia. The road connects Tanjung Belanja in the north to Bota Kiri in the south.

Route background 
The Kilometre Zero of the Federal Route 72 starts at Bota Kiri, at its interchange with the Federal Route 5, the main trunk road of the west coast of Peninsular Malaysia.

Features

At most sections, the Federal Route 72 was built under the JKR R5 road standard, with a speed limit of 90 km/h.

List of junctions and town

References

Malaysian Federal Roads